Club Social y Deportivo Cobán Imperial, nicknamed Los Príncipes Azules ("The Blue Princes"), is a Guatemalan football club based in Cobán, Alta Verapaz. They compete in the Liga Nacional, the top tier of Guatemalan football. They play their home games in the Estadio Verapaz.

It's one of the traditional clubs of Guatemala, the club became league champions for the first time in 2004, when they defeated Municipal in the Clausura tournament final. The club was relegated from Liga Mayor after losing a play-off to Zacapa and spent 2007 until 2014 in the Primera División Group "A" or "B". Following a win over Mictlán in May 2015, Coban was promoted to the Liga Mayor where they currently play.

History
It was founded in 1924 participating for many years in the lower league. The club was invited to be part of the Cup Tournament in the Guatemalan major league in 1960 because they was a good team and their own stadium. Eduardo "Mondongo" Guzmán was the first coach of the Cobaneros, under the name of Magisterio de Cobán , they played only 3 games since from now on they did it under the name of 'Cobán Imperial'; during the tournament they must have played the number of 17 games, however Cobán only fulfilled 13 games since the rest no longer modified the standing, finishing in 14th.

Their debut was against the team called Aviateca tying for one goal, the first goal in its history was scored by player Mario Winter.

In 1964, they won promotion, but could not face more experienced teams and in 1966 they were relegated again. In 1975 when the "Jimmy Álvarez" team due to non-sports situations, changed venue, after its board managed to take part of people in the city of Cobán and therefore managing to change the name to "Cobán Imperial" thus achieving its third participation for 1976, taking advantage of it very well until 1988, when it again occupied the basement of the table. They returned with great vigour in 1994 and declined again in 1996, but achieved promotion again very quickly the following year in 1997, until the last time in 2006, when descended again, but the joy came again for the people of Cobán, on May 24, 2015, as Cobán Imperial defeated Mictlán 1-0 at the Estadio Mateo Flores. Being one of the teams that had many runners-up in a row, they earned the nickname or nickname of the "already merit" until he finally won the national championship at Mateo Flores national stadium in 2004.

The club is one of the most traditional, winning, respected teams and in Guatemala and Central America.

Stadium
The Estadio Jose Angel Rossi or better known as the Estadio Verapaz is located in the city of Cobán in the department of Alta Verapaz in Guatemala. It has a capacity for 15,000 in its different areas distributed among stands and skirts of hills, among whose pine trees the fans are located.

Honours

Domestic honours

Leagues
 Liga Nacional de Guatemala and predecessors 
 Champions (2): Clausura 2004, Apertura 2022
 Copa de Guatemala and predecessors 
 Champions (1): 2018-2019

Performance in international competitions
UNCAF Interclub Cup
2004 - First Round

Current squad

Coaching staff

Managerial history
 Rubén Amorín (1979)
 Julio César Cortés (1997–1998)
 Héctor Trujillo (2000–2001)
 Luís López Meneses (2001)
 Julio González (2003)
 Mario Reig (2004)
 Julio César Antúnez (2007–2008)
 Carlos de Toro (2010)
 Garabet Avedissian (2010–2011)
 Amarini Villatoro (2011–2012)
 Fabricio Benitez (2015-2016)
 Héctor Trujillo (2016)
 Ariel Sena (2016-2017)
 Fabricio Benitez (2017-2019)
 Jorge Rodríguez (2019-2020)
 Rafael Díaz  (2020-2021)
 Ernesto Corti (2021)
 Fabricio Benítez (2021)
 Sebastián Bini (2021-2022)
 Roberto Montoya (2022-2023)
 Eduardo Méndez (2023- )

References

External links
Official Facebook

Football clubs in Guatemala
Association football clubs established in 1924
1924 establishments in Guatemala
Cobán